Karat Rural District is a rural district (dehestan) in the Central District of Taybad County, Razavi Khorasan Province, Iran. At the 2006 census, its population was 14,411, in 2,977 families.  The rural district has 10 villages.

References 

Rural Districts of Razavi Khorasan Province
Taybad County